Roger Davis (January 20, 1884 – March 3, 1980) was an American actor.

Career
Davis was born in Maryland, and played small parts in a number of Hollywood films of the 1920s, 1930s, 1940s and 1950s. They included A Social Celebrity, (1926), Are You There? (1930) and Youth Takes a Fling (1938).  He played roles such as butlers and waiters, and appeared in two of the Tracy-Hepburn vehicles, Adam's Rib (1949) and Pat and Mike (1952). Davis died of cancer on March 3, 1980, at the age of 96.

References

External links

1884 births
1980 deaths
Male actors from Maryland
20th-century American male actors